Blowback is the fifth studio album by English rapper and producer Tricky. It was released on 26 June 2001.

Background
The album features more accessible, popular song structures than his previous records. Tricky later said he "did Blowback for the money, basically 'cause I was broke". He recorded the album with guest musicians, including Red Hot Chili Peppers members Flea, Anthony Kiedis, Josh Klinghoffer, and John Frusciante; Cyndi Lauper, Alanis Morissette, Ed Kowalczyk, and less known artists such as Hawkman, Stephanie McKay and Ambersunshower. "I turned up at the studio and nothing was written," Morissette recalled. "We just worked on it there. He's a very funny man."

Critical reception

Blowback received generally positive reviews from critics, although many of Tricky's longtime fans disliked it. According to Encyclopedia of Popular Music writer Colin Larkin, it was hailed as Tricky's best record since his 1995 debut Maxinquaye, while PopMatters critic Jeffrey Thiessen later called it "a great pop album nobody liked". Simon Price regarded Blowback as Tricky's best album since 1996's Pre-Millennium Tension and "his most accessible since Maxinquaye." He wrote in his review for The Independent at the time that the artist's move to New York "away from the petty politics of the music business" had resulted in "a dark, dense album of future-funk and deep dub". In The New York Times, Neil Strauss called it a radical departure from previous Tricky records, "direct and upfront, the poppiest production Tricky has ever mustered". The Indianapolis Star described it as Tricky's attempt to "prove there's at least one more rap-rock album that's worth a listen". Writing for The Guardian, Dave Simpson was surprised by how "deliriously uplifting, even humorous", the music was, while encompassing "everything from rap-metal (of which there's lots...) to ragga, US power-pop, granite beats, supernatural ambience and even New Romantic. At the same time, it is uniquely, inimitably Tricky."

Some reviewers were more critical. The Wire said while "some of it is just odd enough to work", the album's fusion of hip hop, electro, dancehall, and, "most problematically, stadium alt.rock" proved to be an intriguing but frustrating listen. NME magazine's Sarah Dempster was disappointed in Tricky's choice of guest artists, who she felt came off as "market-friendly gimmicks, novelties that will afford his selective ramblings a wider audience". While viewing it as further evidence of Tricky's evolution from trip hop toward becoming "some sort of rap-pop revolutionary", Pitchforks Brent DiCrescenzo found much of the music "horrible" and plagued by the musician's poor lapses in creative judgment, particularly his duets with Anthony Kiedis and Ed Kowalczyk.

Blowback was named the fourth best album of 2001 by Village Voice critic Robert Christgau. In retrospect, he viewed it as Tricky's most "songful" release, one that was "criminally neglected" by listeners. Bill Friskics-Warren later said Blowback was "an album of funk-rock by way of dancehall reggae" that relied on mainstream-rock guest performers but did not "forego incisiveness for accessibility, resistance for appeasement".

Track listing
 "Excess" – 4:43 (with Alanis Morissette)
 "Evolution Revolution Love" – 4:09
 "Over Me" – 2:57
 "Girls" – 4:21
 "You Don't Wanna" – 5:25
 "#1 Da Woman" – 2:40
 "Your Name" – 3:35
 "Diss Never (Dig Up We History)" – 2:50
 "Bury the Evidence" – 4:51
 "Something in the Way" – 3:24 (Nirvana cover)
 "Five Days" – 4:19 (With Cyndi Lauper)
 "Give It to 'Em" – 3:04
 "A Song for Yukiko" – 4:10

Charts

Weekly charts

Year-end charts

Sales 
As of September 2003 it has sold 95,000 copies in United States according to Nielsen SoundScan.

References

External links
 
 Reviews at moon-palace.de

2001 albums
Tricky (musician) albums
Anti- (record label) albums
Hollywood Records albums